Quán Hành station is a railway station on North–South railway at Km 309 in Vietnam. It's located in Nghi Lộc, Nghệ An between Mỹ Lý station and Vinh station.

References 

Railway stations in Vietnam